The Block Party Series is a Nigerian urban music event held monthly since January 2018, first in Lagos, until the 2020 pandemic.

The Mainland Block Party is on the last Sunday of the month except for the anniversary edition on 1 January. Island Block Party is on 24 December.

The Block Party Series is organized by Tobi 'Alhaji Popping' Mohammed of The Top-Boy Firm, Moyo Shomade of TASH Studios NG, Bizzle Osikoya and Asa Asika of The Plug. The Block Party has partnered with MTV Base.

The Block Party series has featured in four major cities across West Africa; Lagos (Island and Mainland), Abuja, Accra and Ibadan. On stage, it has featured the likes of; Major Lazer, Sarz, Niniola, Teni, Zlatan, Skales, DJ Obi, M.I Abaga, Perruzi, Buju, BOJ, Blaq Bonez.

References

Events in West Africa
2018 establishments in Nigeria